Aa Okkadu is a 2009 Telugu action thriller film starring Ajay, Madhurima, and Suresh Gopi. The film is directed by N S Murthy and was released by Tolly 2 Holly Films on 5 June 2009. Mani Sharma composed the music.

Plot
Sri Krishna (Suresh Gopi) is a successful criminal lawyer. Bujji (Ajay) works under Sri Krishna. Dr. Pavitra (Madhurima) is a psychiatrist who works in a mental hospital. Sri Krishna and Pavitra are disciples of a godman. Pavitra has a family dispute with her brother-in-law and he dies under suspicious circumstances. Slowly a few people associated with Pavitra are killed and the needle of suspicion turns towards Pavitra. The rest of the film is all about who did it.

Cast
 Ajay as Bujji
 Nyra Banerjee as Dr. Pavitra
 Suresh Gopi as Adv. Sri Krishna
 Nassar as Police Officer
 Sai Srujan Pelluri as Soori
 Vijayachander as Judge
 Sunil
 Dharmavarapu Subramanyam
 M. S. Narayana
 Anupama Kumar
 Jenny
 Master Bharath

Soundtrack

References

External links
Aa Okkadu revolves around 7 characters at Oneindia.in, 6 May 2009
Audio review at TeluguCinema, 30 May 2009
Aa Okkadu Synopsis and Review at CineCurry.com
Entertainment.in Ajay, Madhurima sizzle in 'Aa Okkadu' at entertainment.in.msn.com
Download details and credits from Tolly 2 Holly Films website

2000s Telugu-language films